Penacook, originally called "Fisherville", is a village within the city of Concord in Merrimack County, New Hampshire, United States. It lies along Concord's northern border with Boscawen. The name comes from the Pennacook tribe that lived in the area. "Penacook" (Pennycook) was the original name of the plantation incorporated by present-day Concord.

Early hydro-powered industry was attracted to the site, and Penacook grew as a mill town. While dams on the river still generate electricity, most of the 19th- and 20th-century factories, such as Allied Leather, have long since closed.
  
Penacook has its own phone exchange (753), which includes a portion of Boscawen, and its own ZIP Code (03303), shared with Boscawen, Webster, and parts of northern Concord east of the Merrimack River. Most of Penacook is located in the Merrimack Valley School District, though part is in the Concord School District.

Notable people

Red Rolfe, third baseman for New York Yankees and Dartmouth College athletic director

Gallery

References

External links
 Penacook Village Association
 Penacook Historical Society

Concord, New Hampshire
New Hampshire placenames of Native American origin
New Hampshire populated places on the Merrimack River
Unincorporated communities in Merrimack County, New Hampshire
Unincorporated communities in New Hampshire